Irisberto Herrera (born December 7, 1968 in Cuba) is a Spanish-Cuban chess grandmaster. As of 2020 FIDE list his Elo rating was 2420.

In 1986 he won Cuban Junior Chess and in 1996 he and Julio Becerra tied in the Cuban Chess Championship.

References

External links

1968 births
Living people
Chess grandmasters
Cuban chess players
Spanish chess players